Brighton Hill is a district of Basingstoke, England, that was formed around 1970 as part of the Town Centre Development Plan.  The area is bounded to the west by the newer housing estate of Hatch Warren and by the A30. To the east of Brighton Hill, the Viables Industrial Estate and Cranbourne area. The area to the east is a lot older than Brighton Hill itself.  The M3 motorway runs in a straight line to the south of the area, directly next to the southern ebb of Brighton Hill, which sometimes is referred to as Old Hatchwarren.

Origin of the name
The earliest mention of the Brighton Hill name found so far was on a map dated 1877.  However, this seems to relate to a cottage or some other building, situated just over halfway between Hatch Warren Farm (at the rear of the 'Portsmouth Arms' public house) and where the then Hatch Warren Lane and Winchester Road (now the A30) joined at a crossroads.  An excerpt of map is shown here: http://www.british-history.ac.uk/mapsheet.aspx?compid=55119&sheetid=3770&ox=2671&oy=2821&zm=1&czm=1&x=363&y=235

The place marked as Brighton Hill on the 1877 map would roughly at the rear of Hatchwarren School, at the junction between the footpaths. As the map shows, one such footpath was the original Hatch Warren Lane in the area, the other links Brighton Hill with Hatch Warren.

Original layout
Before the estate was built, the area was almost entirely farmland.  The current Hatchwarren Lane, and Beggarwood Lane runs on the site of the original country lanes, which crossed the Basingstoke and Alton Light Railway where Viables Roundabout is today. A section of track lies in the middle of the roundabout, as a permanent reminder of the railway. Cranbourne Lane carried on into Basingstoke Town Centre, passing many agricultural nurseries on the way. At the railway crossing, there was a junction with a road, now known as The Harrow Way but in times gone by, The Basingstoke Bypass. This road stretched from the junction with the road to Alton (now A339) from Hackwood Lane, to the Winchester Road (A30). The A30 route from Basingstoke Town Centre runs to a very similar alignment today, the main difference being a diversion behind Brighton Hill Community School, to allow for building of a retail park.  The only real housing in the area was in a street known as Cumberland Avenue, at the time completely surrounded by fields. The road exists today and is a very unusual place in Brighton Hill.

The Willis Museum features many articles relating to the history of Basingstoke and its suburbs; visit the website at:  https://web.archive.org/web/20071209194451/http://www3.hants.gov.uk/museum/willis-museum/local-studies-willis.htm .

Housing growth
The first section of Brighton Hill to be completed was the Quilter Road area, with much of the ex — council housing from Haydn Road in the west, to Wagner Close in the east following soon after. Part of this development was a number of medium-sized tower blocks, namely in Verdi Close, Mozart Close and Schubert Road.  These had been demolished by the early 1990s and replaced with more modern houses. One large development was the private sector housing, stretching from Handel Close in the west, to Porter Road to the east. This was completed by the mid 1970s and filled in all the former farmland in the Hatchwarren Lane/Harrow Way/Winchester Road square.  The remainder of the space adjacent to Winchester Road was occupied by Brighton Hill School — now known as Brighton Hill Community College.  Many new roads were constructed, Brighton Way and Gershwin Road being very important feeder roads to the new housing. It is important not to forget the development on the south west side of the estate, consisting of Bach Close and Novello Close.

Later additions included the Guinness Trust development, from Beecham Berry in the south to Boyce Close and Copland Close in the north. This development filled more of the gaps left, with Boyce Close and Copland Close in quite close proximity to the A30 Winchester Road. Tallis Gardens was created from part of the Chalk Ridge Primary School playing field in around 1990, and at a similar time a housing development took place on Gershwin Road, in addition to a new school, Hatchwarren Junior and Infant School. Numerous small developments were also added, such as Vivaldi Close and Gershwin Court, a sheltered housing area.

Education
Brighton Hill was eventually provided with no less than one secondary school, and four [primary] schools. The secondary school is now known as Brighton Hill Community School, opening in 1975 and the primary schools are Manorfield School, Chalk Ridge School and Hatchwarren School. Beechdown School which was largely destroyed by fire in November 2000, and now remains closed. The area has now been redeveloped with housing, Brighton Hill pre-School uses part of what remained from the old Beechdown School. Queen Mary's College is around a 20-minute walk from Brighton Hill, nearby to the Town Centre. Transport links have always been provided for those in further education. The town's technical college is also near to Basingstoke Town Centre.

Leisure and entertainment
One popular destination for many of Brighton Hill's residents was the Pig and Whistle public house, sited near the junction with Chopin Road and Brighton Way.  This was closed in 2000 (after many years of public order problems) in preparation for the clearance of the former shopping precinct.  No replacement was provided.  The last owners were the Scottish & Newcastle brewery.

One very popular attraction was the Davies Snooker Centre, which was at first floor level in the place now occupied by the Girlzone Gym.  This become known as Premiers, and then as Cosys before finally closing.  One of the Davies Snooker Centre's former tables, table five, now resides in the Kestrel public house in Kempshott. Eric Bristow is reputed to have practiced his skills at the DSC on occasion.  While under the Premiers label, a large Scalextric track was built, with regulars racing the model cars round the vast track.  This was featured in the Basingstoke Gazette when new.

The main drinking establishment currently remaining on the estate is the Brighton Hill Community Association. This is a place that requires membership, in the same way as many others, such as working men's clubs. The building is used in the daytime by a play school, and normally opens at 1900 every day.  Exceptions are Fridays and weekends.

The former Stag and Hounds public house is nearby to Brighton Hill, being situated by the Brighton Hill Roundabout on the former A30.  The later diversion of the road passes behind the building. his has long been taken over by the Harvester chain, and a Travelodge Inn has been built nearby. A similar establishment is nearby to the A30, opposite to the Guinness Trust development, at Down Grange.

For those seeking other forms of leisure, Brighton Hill was supplied with plentiful green spaces and open areas.  There is a lot of land used as playing fields in the area. An adventure playground exists in the large green area near the M3 motorway, at the southern end of Hatchwarren Lane.  Many playgrounds were provided in residential areas, but most have been removed amid safety fears.

Viables Craft Centre is near to the estate, with regular runnings on the miniature railway line and craft fairs.

Brighton Hill Centre and retail areas
Brighton Hill Centre was built along with much of the housing development in the area. This consisted of shops and a supermarket, along with the Pig and Whistle public house. Plentiful car parking was provided, and in years gone by Brighton Hill Centre had a traditional greengrocer and a butcher's shop, a council office and the Unwins off licence. These are now long gone. When the supermarket was first opened, Sainsbury's traded there, closing the store when the Hatch Warren branch opened in 1988. Hatch Warren is a much bigger store, and provides more range than the Brighton Hill one did. After Sainsbury's moved on, the building was empty for 18 months until Robert Greig opened there in May 1990. Robert Greig remained there for just over 8 years, until its closure in July 1998. After this, the building was left empty until its demolition. The local doctors surgery, the Gillies Health Centre, was provided within the centre complex, and the original building was demolished in 2002. Surgery continued in a temporary Portakabin structure until the new surgery was opened in 2004.  The new one is on the site of the original and is also the base for The Life Right Centre for Good Health & Wellbeing, Life Right Wellbeing Retreats and The Life Right Foundation, Basingstoke's only dedicated children's charity, providing grants to disadvantaged children who have suffered abuse, neglect or trauma. The supermarket is open to 10:00 PM from 07:00 AM Monday to Saturday, Sunday it is open from 10:00 AM to 04:00 PM. 

A Post Office had always been provided at Brighton Hill Centre until its closure in June 2008.

Public toilets were provided adjacent to the doctors surgery, but these fell into disrepair and were taken out of use in the late 1980s.  At present there are only eleven public conveniences in the Basingstoke and Deane area, and a considerable number are outside of the town.

Misselbrook and Weston opened a shop on Stanford Road in the 1980s, this is now under the One Stop brand.

Much retail development has taken around the estate, with the area by Brighton Hill Roundabout seeing much change.  The former Smiths Industries site has become a retail park, featuring some quite large units. The largest is the Toys R Us shop, and Harveys Furniture in large units. Staples, Carpet Right and a Currys PC World Superstore are also at the site. There is also a Pizza Hut and a McDonald's at the retail park. Nearby a development has taken place by the A30 Winchester Road, with Homebase, Hobby Craft, Axminster, Home Bargains & a Harvester and Travelodge as prominent features.

Public transport
Bus transport for many years was provided by the National Bus Company, under the Hampshire Bus name. Long ago public transport along the A30 was provided by the Hants and Dorset bus company, but this predates much development in the area. After the privatisation of the bus industry, services are run in the area by Stagecoach South.

Former notable bus routes were the 39, 40, 50 and 59, although much of this network was considerably altered in the year 2000.  Bus routes for the estate are now served by routes 1 and 12, the former serving Brighton Hill at an eight to ten-minute frequency for much of the time. Exceptions are on Sundays/Bank Holidays and in evenings. Route 12 operates hourly. Of the two routes, route 1 is seen as the more popular route for the Town Centre, operating direct via Winchester Road, whereas the 12 runs via Cranbourne before reaching the Town Centre.

Decline
After the closure of the local supermarket the shopping precinct became run down and vandalised. Some shops closed down over this period. Many residents did not feel safe using the area, particularly at night.

All change
In the early 2000s there were rumours of a complete overhaul of the Brighton Hill Centre, and surrounding areas. Many residents were sceptical and morale at the time was low. For what seemed like a very long time, Brighton Hill was missing out on many basic features, one example is the lack of cashpoint in the area, the nearest being around two miles away. Provisions in the convenience stores in the area were a lot more expensive than those in the supermarket, particularly affecting the elderly and disabled who found it harder to travel further than the estate. The general atmosphere in the area did not do much to lift residents' spirits at this stage in time.

However, in 2002 the demolition of the former supermarket began. This involved digging up car parking and also demolition of the Pig and Whistle public house, by this time closed. The work also involved filling in of 'subways' under roads in the immediate area and new crossings provided. This was as the former subways were often inhabited by youths and were seen by residents as intimidating places. Additional footpaths were built, particularly in the green area behind the precinct and also a new playground built at a higher level than the previous one. Bus stops nearby were lengthened to accommodate two buses easily and two new roundabouts constructed, adding to the 'Doughnut City' label Basingstoke has already. Much of the site has been taken over by the Asda supermarket and associated parking spaces.

Brighton Hill today
Brighton Hill Centre is now a busy and thriving place, with much trade passing through the Asda supermarket, which opened in June 2003. The redevelopment seen in the early part of the 2000s has brightened up the shopping area immensely, and improved much morale in the surrounding area. With good shopping facilities, private healthcare centre (Life Right Centre for Good Health & Wellbeing) and good transport links, Brighton Hill has much to offer. There are many food outlets and variety in the different premises at the centre. Also general upkeep and maintenance is done to a high standard by the local council.

Local government
Despite Basingstoke having a Conservative MP, Maria Miller, Brighton Hill is a Liberal Democrat and Labour-run ward. The ward is split into two areas, Brighton Hill South and Brighton Hill North. The Southern part of the ward has John Barnes (Liberal Democrat) and David Eyre (Labour) as local councillor. The North part of the ward has Brian Gurden (Liberal Democrat) and Carolyn Wooldridge (Labour) as local councillor. The boundary is generally along Quilter Road and Brighton Way.

Links to local government figures are provided below:

https://web.archive.org/web/20071030125320/http://www.mariamiller.co.uk/type2.asp?id=59&type=2 – the page for Maria Miller MP

https://web.archive.org/web/20070823193629/http://councillor.basingstoke.gov.uk/JohnBarnes/ — the page for Cllr Barnes

https://web.archive.org/web/20120513055033/http://councillor.basingstoke.gov.uk/briangurden — the page for Cllr Gurden

References

Areas of Basingstoke